William H. Murphy (a.k.a. "Gentle Willie")  was a Major League Baseball player, who played outfield in 1884 for the Cleveland Blues of the National League and the  Washington Nationals of the American Association.

External links
Baseball-Reference.com page

Cleveland Blues (NL) players
Washington Nationals (AA) players
1864 births
Baseball players from Massachusetts
Major League Baseball outfielders
19th-century baseball players
Rockville (minor league baseball) players
Lawrence (minor league baseball) players
Meriden Maroons players
Boston Blues players
Meriden Silvermen players
New Haven Blues players
Minneapolis Millers (baseball) players
Hartford (minor league baseball) players
Norwalk (minor league baseball) players
Norwich (minor league baseball) players
Year of death missing
Plainfield Crescent Cities players